Alyaksandr Lyantsevich (born 2 May 1979) is a retired Belarusian professional footballer.

His brother Dmitry Lentsevich is also a former professional footballer.

Honours
Gomel
Belarusian Cup winner: 2001–02

External links
 

1979 births
Living people
Belarusian footballers
Belarus international footballers
Association football goalkeepers
FC Lida players
FC Gomel players
FC Khimik Svetlogorsk players
FC Energetik-BGU Minsk players
FC Minsk players
FC Dnepr Mogilev players
People from Lida
Sportspeople from Grodno Region